Not the Nine O'Clock News is a British television sketch comedy show which was broadcast on BBC2 from 1979 to 1982. Originally shown as a comedy alternative to the Nine O'Clock News on BBC1, it features satirical sketches on then-current news stories and popular culture, as well as parody songs, comedy sketches, re-edited videos, and spoof television formats. The programme features Rowan Atkinson, Pamela Stephenson, Mel Smith, and Griff Rhys Jones, as well as Chris Langham in the first series.

Format
The format was a deliberate departure from the stream-of-consciousness meta-comedy pioneered by Monty Python's Flying Circus, returning to a more conventional sketch format. Sketches were mostly self-contained, lasting from a few seconds to a few minutes, and often had a degree of naturalism in performance. The series launched the careers of several high-profile actors and writers, and also led to other comedic series including Blackadder and Alas Smith and Jones.

The series benefited from video editing and recording techniques. The pace was enhanced by jump-cutting between library clips, usually of politicians, royalty, or celebrities. Then-Prime
Minister Margaret Thatcher complained when, by adroit image editing, the programme implied she had crashed a car. Effects used in pop videos, provided by the Quantel Paintbox, were often a highlight of the musical numbers.

History

Background
Not the Nine O'Clock News was produced by John Lloyd. Lloyd pitched the idea to the heads of BBC Comedy and Light Entertainment, and was given a six-programme series on condition that he collaborate with Sean Hardie, who had worked in current affairs at the BBC.

Initially, Lloyd and Hardie were considering doing a lampoon of actuality programmes à la The Frost Report with Rowan Atkinson portraying an old-fashioned host attacking liberal and/or modern trends. The programme was to be called Sacred Cows, but the news programme was chosen because of its larger number of sources. The series’ name derived from its schedule, as it originally aired on BBC2 at the same time as the Nine O'Clock News on BBC1.

Aborted first series
Aside from Atkinson, the original cast comprised Christopher Godwin, John Gorman, Chris Langham, Willoughby Goddard, and Jonathan Hyde, and the first episode of a planned series was scheduled for 2 April 1979; this also featured Chris Emmett (impersonating Denis Healey), Robert Llewelyn (impersonating Bob Hope) and Hertz Rental (narrating general elections in Greenland).

As the programme was originally scheduled to air in the time-slot occupied by Fawlty Towers, John Cleese was to have introduced the first episode in a sketch referring to a technicians' strike (then in progress) that hindered the production of the series, explaining (in character as Basil Fawlty) that there was no programme that week, so a "tatty revue" would be broadcast instead. However, the 1979 general election intervened, and the programme was pulled as being too political, being replaced with a repeat of the American sitcom Rhoda.

The sketch with Cleese was broadcast later that year, when the final episode of Fawlty Towers went out during the broadcast run of the first series of Not The Nine O'Clock News, though the significance of the sketch was lost to some degree. This link is included on the Region 2 DVD boxset of Fawlty Towers. Basil's waiter Manuel, played by Andrew Sachs, also appeared at the end of the unaired episode, trying to get a joke about the Ayatollah's contact lenses.

Other sketches of the unaired pilot episode were also lifted or remade on episodes throughout the first series. Healey's and Hope's impressions were achieved by the use of "talking head" puppets, which in the mid-1980s would become a characteristic staple of Spitting Image, produced by Lloyd in its early series.

In production
Lloyd and Hardie decided to re-cast the series, retaining Langham and Atkinson. They wanted to bring in a woman, but Victoria Wood turned the programme down. Lloyd met Pamela Stephenson at a party, and she agreed to join. Atkinson, Langham, and Stephenson were joined by Mel Smith, who was scheduled to work on the pilot, but declined after reading the script (he called the finished pilot in retrospect "the worst half hour of TV" that he’d ever seen). The first series was criticised for being "a poor mix of stand up, and a mild portion of sketches" and newspaper reviews referring to it as "extremely offensive" and that it “should not be allowed on TV". Ratings were dismal as well: the first episode had fewer than a million viewers.

However, the network controller reportedly liked the programme so much, that a second series of seven episodes was commissioned, also helped by budgetary cuts at BBC, which were repeatedly poked fun at in the second series' premiere episode, entitled "The Outrageously Expensive Not the Nine O'Clock News". Such cuts also forced the show to drastically reduce the use of outside scenes (which were recorded on film) as well as minor players. The shock value prominent during the first season was also toned down in favour of a more "offbeat" tone.

For the second series, Langham was replaced by Griff Rhys-Jones, who had already been a regular player during the first series, aside from having directed the radio programme The Atkinson People. The second series of Not the Nine O’Clock News won the Silver Rose at the Montreux Festival and a BAFTA Award for Best Light Entertainment Programme in 1982. The show's later series achieved improved ratings and became critically acclaimed.

Not the Nine O'Clock News became a stage production in Oxford and London in 1982, but the main performers decided to end the project while it was a success: Stephenson began a Hollywood film career, Atkinson recorded the first series of Blackadder in 1983, and Smith and Jones became a double act in Alas Smith and Jones. An American adaptation, Not Necessarily the News ran for seven years, from 1983 to 1990 on the Home Box Office cable television channel.

Content
Satire was a key theme in the series' comedy. For example, one spoof news element might include a routine announcement that NASA had once again announced a delay in the launch of its Space Shuttle owing to technical difficulties, as the screen showed the shuttle on its launch pad with oxygen streaming off the tanks, overlaid with the sound of a car engine turning over but not starting. An opening graphic featured the same blue screen and white analogue clock ticking down to 9:00 p.m. as preceded the original Nine O'Clock News, followed by an announcement of the time in similar voice and, in parody, the announcement that this was "definitely not the Nine O'Clock News". Skits could include scenes such as a group of rural Americans at a barbecue singing several minutes of comical implausibles like "I'm prepared to believe that Nixon wasn't a crook; I'm prepared to believe Love Story'''s a readable book..." and finally concluding, "I believe that the devil is ready to repent; – but I can't believe Ronald Reagan is president."

Legacy
The programme is credited with bringing alternative comedy to British television: Lloyd once commented he wanted to do a "modern, working-class" comedy in contrast to other series of the time, such as The Two Ronnies, as well as attempting to replicate the satire boom of the early 1960s that launched the careers of John Cleese, Dudley Moore, Eric Idle, Tim Brooke-Taylor and others. This also happened at a time that the magazine National Lampoon, The Second City troupes and Saturday Night Live became showcases of alternative comedy in North America.

In 2005, Atkinson, Smith, Stephenson, Langham, and producer Lloyd reunited to talk to Sue MacGregor about the series. Langham's departure was touched upon, with Lloyd seeming to take the blame, though Atkinson had campaigned for Langham to be kept in the cast. (Langham actually refused to speak to his former cast-mates for a number of years after he was fired, until appearing as a regular on Smith and Jones in the 1990s). The Reunion was broadcast on Radio 4 on 31 July 2005.

A documentary featuring the cast reminiscing about the making of the programme was shown on BBC 2 on 28 December 2009, before one of the 1995 compilation shows was aired (despite a "complete episode" being billed in television listings). The documentary was repeated on 3 August 2013, just over two weeks after the death of Smith.

Crew
The main writers included Colin Bostock-Smith, Andy Hamilton, Peter Brewis, Richard Curtis, and Clive Anderson. However, the producers accepted scripts for sketches from a wide range of writers (including a then-undergraduate Stephen Fry), and ensured the programme remained topical by recording sketches only days before broadcast. Howard Goodall (subsequently composer of the theme music for Blackadder, Red Dwarf, and The Vicar of Dibley) was musical director. Bill Wilson directed the first three series, while Geoff Posner handled the fourth.

Episodes
A total of 27 episodes of 25–30-minute duration were broadcast over four series.

Series 1 (1979)

 Unaired Pilot Episode (scheduled to air - 2 April 1979)
 Kenny Everett in Not the Nine O'Clock News – 16 October 1979
 Episode 2 – 23 October 1979
 Episode 3 – 30 October 1979
 Episode 4 – 6 November 1979
 Episode 5 – 13 November 1979
 Episode 6 – 20 November 1979

Series 2 (1980)

 The Outrageously Expensive Not the Nine O'Clock News – 31 March 1980
 Episode 2 – 7 April 1980
 Don't Get Your Vicars in a Twist – 14 April 1980
 International Darts – 21 April 1980
 Episode 5 – 28 April 1980
 Episode 6 – 5 May 1980
 Death Lasers of Kazaan – 12 May 1980

Series 3 (1980)

 Not the Nine O'Clock in the Morning News – 27 October 1980
 Election Special – 3 November 1980
 Miss World 1980 – 10 November 1980
 Nationwide – 17 November 1980
 Episode 5 – 24 November 1980
 Episode 6 – 1 December 1980
 Episode 7 – 8 December 1980
 Episode 8 – 15 December 1980

Series 4 (1982)

 Episode 1 – 1 February 1982
 Episode 2 – 8 February 1982
 Hi Se Seo An Nuacht Ag A Naoi Chlog – 15 February 1982
 Episode 4 – 22 February 1982
 Made in Wales – 1 March 1982
 Shame – 8 March 1982

Specials
 Not the Least of Not the Nine O'Clock News (28 December 1979; Christmas Special)
 The Best Of Not The Nine O'Clock News (9 September 1980)
 25 Years Of Not The Nine O'Clock News (16 September 1980)
 25 Years Of Not The Nine O'Clock News (23 September 1980; Material from Series 2)
 Not The Nine O'Clock Christmas: Write Your Own (30 December 1980; Material from Series 3)
 Not Another Not The Nine O'Clock News (9 October 1981)
 An Eight Chance To See Not The Nine O'Clock News (16 October 1981)
 The Last Of The Summer Repeats (23 October 1981; Material from Series 1, 2, and 3)
 Not The Nine O'Clock News (7, 14 & 28 September 1983; Material from Series 4)
 Not The Nine O'Clock News (October – December 1995; 8 Compilations)

The series has rarely been repeated; eight re-cut and condensed (to make it "faster and funnier than ever") "episodes" made for a video edition in 1995 are shown instead. This is primarily because the original episodes in their entirety lampooned events that were in the news at the time. The last repeat of the show was on Sunday 27 March 2016 at 2:55am on Gold.

Commercial releases

Video and DVD
Two highly edited VHS releases of the series, entitled The Gorilla Kinda Lingers and Nice Video, Shame about the Hedgehog, were released in 1995.

In August 2003, these videos were released on DVD under the title of The Best of Not the Nine O'Clock News: Volume One, with The Best of Not the Nine O'Clock News: Volume Two following a year later. Both of these are available in one set, unavailable separately, in Region 1.

Records
Three vinyl albums were released at the time the series was screening, entitled Not the Nine O'Clock News, Hedgehog Sandwich, and The Memory Kinda Lingers. These albums were very successful, with the first two both reaching the top ten of the UK albums chart, a rare feat for a spoken word album. Hedgehog Sandwich also peaked at number 89 in Australia.

The original version of The Memory Kinda Lingers is a double LP. The second disc is titled Not in Front of the Audience and is a live recording of the cast's stage production. Hedgehog Sandwich and the first disc of The Memory Kinda Lingers were later combined on a BBC double-length cassette and double-CD set.

"The Ayatollah Song" b/w "Gob on You" (as featured in the TV show) and "I Like Trucking" b/w "Supa Dupa" were also released as singles.

The 1980 single "Typing Pool" by 'Pam and the Paper Clips' (EMI 5015), is variously ascribed to Pamela Stephenson and NtNON. It was in fact written by Roger and Nigel Planer, who were among the show's many writers.

Books and miscellaneous
Three books were released to tie in with the series: Not! The Nine O'Clock News, a collection of classic material rewritten and restructured as a parody of the short-lived magazine Now!; Not the Royal Wedding (the royal wedding in question being the marriage of Charles and Diana); and Not the General Election, a tie-in with the 1983 general election. The first was reprinted in 1995 as Not for Sale. Not the Royal Wedding was promoted by a little-known radio spin-off, Not the Nuptials, transmitted on BBC Radio 1. The same station had also previously produced a behind-the-scenes documentary on Not the Nine O'Clock News as part of their magazine series Studio B15.

Two 'page-a-day' tear-off calendars, edited by John Lloyd and containing several contributions from Douglas Adams, were released in the early 1980s (Not 1982 and Not 1983). Also published around this time was a spoof Orwellian edition of The Times newspaper, Not the 1984 Times, which – although widely assumed to be – was not actually connected to the series.

See also
 Not Necessarily the News''
 Drop the Dead Donkey

References

External links

 Comedy Guide

Complete episode guide sketch by sketch
Museum of Broadcast Communications: biographical information

1970s British television sketch shows
1980s British television sketch shows
1979 British television series debuts
1982 British television series endings
BBC television sketch shows
English-language television shows
British satirical television series
British black comedy television shows
News parodies